Ruslan Yevgenyevich Gordiyenko (born 17 February 1995) is a Russian football player.

Club career
He made his debut in the Russian Football National League for FC Luch-Energiya Vladivostok on 29 March 2015 in a game against FC Anzhi Makhachkala.

References

External links
 Profile by Russian Football National League

1995 births
People from Primorsky Krai
Living people
Russian people of Ukrainian descent
Russian footballers
Association football forwards
FC Luch Vladivostok players
FC Irtysh Omsk players
FC Sokol Saratov players
Sportspeople from Primorsky Krai